INS Amba (A54) was the only submarine tender ship in service with the Indian Navy. It is a modified Soviet  design built to Indian specifications in Nikolayev (the present-day Mykolaiv in Ukraine) in 1968. Deviations from the standard Ugra design include four 76 mm guns instead of the 57 mm ones mounted on Soviet units.

On 26 May 2001 a fire broke out in the laundry section of Amba during a routine refit at the Cochin Shipyard, suffocating two washermen. Amba was decommissioned from service in July 2006.

References

Ugra-class submarine tenders of the Indian Navy
India–Soviet Union relations
Ships built in the Soviet Union
1968 ships